Beatrice Gelmini (born 28 October 1966) is an Italian former competitive figure skater. She won four Italian national titles and represented Italy at the 1988 Winter Olympics in Calgary, finishing 11th. She competed at multiple European and World Championships, achieving her best result, ninth, at the 1989 World Championships in Paris. After retiring from competition, she became a coach in Aosta.

Competitive highlights

References 

1966 births
Italian female single skaters
Living people
Olympic figure skaters of Italy
Figure skaters at the 1988 Winter Olympics
Place of birth missing (living people)